This page lists public opinion polls in connection with the 2017 Iranian presidential election, which were held on 19 May 2017, with a run-off the week after if no candidate secures an absolute majority of the vote in the first round.

Polls

2017

Iran-based pollsters 
According to the Al-Monitor, "it’s not unusual in Iran for news outlets to publish reports of nonscientific surveys. Without further details, such polls shouldn’t be considered reliable if they lack the disclosure of basic methodological information". A persistent problem in Iranian pollsters, they also do not report the standard disclosure items for legitimate surveys including sample size or margin of error.

Pre-2017 polls

Approval ratings

2017

Turnout

References

2017 Iranian presidential election
Iranian presidential election
2017